Sędziszowa may refer to the following places in Poland:
Sędziszowa, Lower Silesian Voivodeship (south-west Poland)
Sędziszowa, Lesser Poland Voivodeship (south Poland)